Marysville station was the last passenger rail station to operate in Marysville, California. 

The depot was a stop on the Southern Pacific Shasta Route until their services here were stopped in 1958. Passenger trains to the city ceased in 1970 when the original California Zephyr was discontinued. Amtrak's formation in 1971 left Marysville out of the nation's "basic system," but a California Senate Joint Resolution from 1974 requested that the Coast Starlight be rerouted through Sacramento including a stop in Marysville. Despite opposition from Southern Pacific, service began on April 25, 1982. Amtrak ceased operating at the station by November 1999, as the service was rerouted over the shorter Sacramento Subdivision. The former Marysville Western Pacific Depot on that line was not reactivated, ending service to the city. Union Pacific continues to use the station building as a field office.

References

Buildings and structures in Yuba County, California
Marysville, California
Railway stations in the United States opened in 1982
Railway stations closed in 1999
Former Amtrak stations in California
Union Pacific Railroad stations
Former Southern Pacific Railroad stations in California